The Epistle of Ignatius to the Philadelphians (often abbreviated Ign. Phil.) is an epistle attributed to Ignatius of Antioch, a second-century bishop of Antioch, and addressed to the church in Philadelphia of Asia Minor. It was written during Ignatius' transport from Antioch to his execution in Rome.

Composition

Philadelphians is one of seven epistles attributed to Ignatius that are generally accepted as authentic. In 5th century, this collection was enlarged by spurious letters.

It is clear that Philadelphians was written soon before the martyrdom of Ignatius, but it is uncertain when precisely this martyrdom occurred. Tradition places the martyrdom of Ignatius in the reign of Trajan, who was emperor of Rome from 98 to 117 AD. While many scholars accept the traditional dating of Ignatius' martyrdom under Trajan, others have argued for a somewhat later date. Richard Pervo dated Ignatius' death to 135-140 AD, and British classicist Timothy Barnes has argued for a date some time in the 140s AD.

Content
Ignatius warns the Philadelphians not to start any schisms within their church, but to stay unified and obey their bishops and presbyters:

He warns the Philadelphians not to listen to Jewish Christians who were advocating that Christians ought to observe the Torah:

Ignatius also mentions that his home church in Antioch has recently found "peace" (cf. Ign. Poly. 7), resolving its earlier schisms, and that the Philadelphians should follow its example by electing deacons to lead their church:

References

2nd-century Christian texts
Apocryphal epistles
Letters (message)
Works by the Church Fathers